

Gentlemen
 Charles III, Lord of Mann
 Members of the British royal family when visiting the Island:
The Prince of Wales
The Duke of Sussex
Prince George of Wales
Prince Louis of Wales
Prince Archie of Sussex
The Duke of York
The Duke of Edinburgh
Earl of Wessex
The Duke of Gloucester
The Duke of Kent
Prince Michael of Kent
 Lieutenant Governor
 Deputy Governor, First Deemster and Clerk of the Rolls
 President of Tynwald
 Chief Minister
 Second Deemster
 Lord Bishop of Sodor and Man
 Speaker of the House of Keys
 The Government Ministers
Minister of the Treasury
Minister of Home Affairs
Minister of Health and Social Security
Minister of Education
Minister of Trade and Industry
Minister of Tourism and Leisure
Minister of Transport
Minister of Agriculture, Fisheries and Forestry
Minister of Local Government and the Environment
 HM Attorney General
 Members of the Legislative Council
 Members of the House of Keys
 Deputy Deemster
Nobility, et al. (as the Order of precedence in England and Wales)
Knights, Privy Counsellors, Judges, Baronets et al. (as the Order of precedence in England and Wales)
Eldest Sons of Various Grades (as the Order of precedence in England and Wales)
Members of Orders (as the Order of precedence in England and Wales)
Younger Sons of Various Grades (as the Order of precedence in England and Wales)
Lesser Titles (as the Order of precedence in England and Wales)

Secondary Precedence
 The High Bailiff
 Captains of the Parishes
 The Chief Constable
 The Chief Secretary
 The Chief Registrar
 The Mayor of Douglas
 Chairmen of the Town and Village Commissioners
 The Archdeacon of Sodor and Man
 The Vicar General
 The Deputy Chief Constable
 The Deputy High Bailiff
 Coroner of Glenfaba and Michael
 Coroner of Ayre and Garff
 Coroner of Middle
 Coroner of Rushen

Isle
Society of the Isle of Man